Archie Lang is the name of:

 Archie Lang (footballer) (1860–1925), Scottish footballer
 Archie Lang (politician), Canadian politician
 Archie Lang (actor), American actor